The following lists events that happened during 1954 in the Union of Soviet Socialist Republics.

Incumbents
 First Secretary of the Communist Party of the Soviet Union – Nikita Khrushchev
 Chairman of the Presidium of the Supreme Soviet of the Soviet Union – Kliment Voroshilov
 Chairman of the Council of Ministers of the Soviet Union – Georgy Malenkov

Events

January
 25 January-18 February – Berlin Conference (1954)

February
 19 February – 1954 transfer of Crimea

March
 14 March – Soviet Union legislative election, 1954

May
 16 May-26 June – Kengir uprising

June
 6 June – Moscow's statue of Yuriy Dolgorukiy, originally conceived in 1947 in recognition of the 800th anniversary of the city's foundation, is finally unveiled.
 26 June – The world's first civilian nuclear power station, Obninsk Nuclear Power Plant, is commissioned.

September
 14 September – The Totskoye nuclear exercise is held.

Births
 23 February – Viktor Yushchenko, third President of Ukraine
 4 March – Irina Ratushinskaya, writer
 16 June – Sergey Kuryokhin, composer
 17 August – Anatoly Kudryavitsky, writer
 30 August – Alexander Lukashenko, President of Belarus

Deaths
 12 February – Dziga Vertov, filmmaker (born 1896)
 22 November – Andrey Vyshinsky, diplomat (born 1883)

References

See also
 1954 in fine arts of the Soviet Union
 List of Soviet films of 1954

 
1950s in the Soviet Union
Years in the Soviet Union
Soviet Union
Soviet Union
Soviet Union